Saint-Vivien-de-Medoc is a commune in the Gironde department in Nouvelle-Aquitaine in southwestern France.

It was the site of an important action in Operation Frankton in December 1942.

Population

See also
Communes of the Gironde department

References

Communes of Gironde